Simpsons Bay is a rural locality on Bruny Island in the local government area of Kingborough in the Hobart region of Tasmania. The 2016 census has a population of 55 for the state suburb of Simpsons Bay.

History
Simpsons Bay was gazetted as a locality in 1967.

Geography
The D'Entrecasteaux Channel forms much of the western boundary, all of the northern, and most of the eastern.

Road infrastructure
The C628 route (Simpsons Bay Road) enters from the south and runs north to the centre, where it ends.

References

Localities of Kingborough Council
Towns in Tasmania
Bruny Island